Giovanni Tonucci (born 4 December 1941 in Fano, PU, Italy) is an Italian archbishop of the Catholic Church. He worked in the diplomatic service of the Holy See from 1971 until his retirement in 2017.

Diplomatic career
From 1971 till the end of 1973 his diplomatic career took him to Yaoundé, Cameroon, then, from 1974 to 1976 to the United Kingdom. From July 1976 he was back in Rome, assigned to the Section for General Affairs of the Holy See Secretariat of State where he worked with Agostino Casaroli, until being transferred, in April 1978, to the Section for the Relations with States under Achille Silvestrini. At the end of the 1984 he was assigned to the Apostolic Nunciature in Belgrade, at that time still the Yugoslavia, where he worked until the summer of 1987 when he was transferred to the Nunicature to the United States in Washington.

On 21 October 1989 Tonucci was appointed Titular Archbishop of Torcello and Apostolic Nuncio to Bolivia.

He was consecrated a bishop on 6 January 1990 by Pope John Paul II, with co-consecrators Msgr. Giovanni Battista Re and Msgr. Miroslav Stefan Marusyn.

On 9 March 1996 he was named the Apostolic Nuncio to Kenya.

The role of Permanent Observer Permanent Observer of the Holy See to the UN Environment and Human Settlements Programs (UNEP/UN–HABITAT) was added the next year.

On 16 October 2004, Pope John Paul II appointed him Apostolic Nuncio to Sweden, Denmark, Finland, Iceland and Norway.

Later offices
On 18 October 2007 Pope Benedict XVI appointed him Prelate of Territorial Prelature of Loreto and Pontifical Delegate for the Shrine of the Holy House of Loreto. Pope Francis named him Pontifical Delegate for the Basilica of Saint Anthony in Padua on 8 March 2014, and accepted his resignation from both these positions on 20 May 2017.

Family
His brother Paolo Maria Tonucci was a missionary in Brazil from 1965 to 1994. He conducted a battle for the rights of the poor people against the military dictatorship, which led to his being characterized as "unworthy" of Brazilian citizenship.

Works
 Giovanni Tonucci, "God's letter to me – 101 questions and answers on the Bible".
 Giovanni Tonucci, Roberto Ansuini; "Don Paolo". Text by Paolo Tonucci [and oth.], Fondazione Cassa di Risparmio di Fano, Grapho 5, 2004.
 Giovanni Tonucci, "Visioni di un pellegrino. Le foto di Mzee Mwenda". Edited in Italian and English, Velar, 2006. .
 Giovanni Tonucci, Massimo Ciavaglia, "El Vangel cum l'ha scrit San Marc". (dialect of Fano), Ven. Confraternitas Sanctae Mariae Suffragii, Fano, 2007.

See also
Diplomatic missions of the Holy See
Diplomacy of the Holy See
John Anthony Kaiser

References

Additional sources

External links
 Catholic Hierarchy 
 Gcatholic

1941 births
Pontifical Ecclesiastical Academy alumni
Apostolic Nuncios to Bolivia
Apostolic Nuncios to Kenya
Apostolic Nuncios to Denmark
Apostolic Nuncios to Iceland
Apostolic Nuncios to Finland
Apostolic Nuncios to Norway
Apostolic Nuncios to Sweden
20th-century Italian Roman Catholic titular archbishops
Permanent Observers of the Holy See to UNEP and UN-HABITAT
Living people
People from Fano
21st-century Italian Roman Catholic titular archbishops